Fredericks is a surname. Notable people with the surname include:

Sports
Clayton Fredericks (born 1967), Australian equestrian athlete and Olympic medalist (married to Lisa Fredericks)
Cornel Fredericks (born 1990), South African hurdler
Eddie Fredericks (born 1977), South African rugby union footballer
Frankie Fredericks (born 1967), Namibian sprinter and Olympic medalist
Lucinda Fredericks (born 1967), British-born equestrian athlete for Australia (married to Clayton Fredericks)
Roy Fredericks (1942–2000), West Indian cricketer
Ryan Fredericks (born 1992), English footballer for Bristol City Football Club
Stanton Fredericks (born 1978), South African footballer

Arts
Carole Fredericks (1952–2001), American French-speaking blues singer
Charles DeForest Fredricks (1823–1894), American photographer
Charles Fredericks (1918–1970), American actor in 1950/60s Westerns
Dean Fredericks (1924–1999), American actor
Fred Fredericks (1929–2015), American cartoonist
Jean Fredericks (1906–1990), Native American photographer
Mariah Fredericks, American novelist
Marshall Fredericks (1908–1998), American sculptor
Neal Fredericks (1969–2004), American cinematographer
Scott Fredericks (1943–2017), Irish actor
Sawyer Fredericks, (born 1999), American folk singer-songwriter

Other
A. A. Fredericks (1891–1975), American educator and Democratic politician in Louisiana
Claude Fredericks (1923–2013), American poet, playwright, printer, writer, and teacher
Cryn Fredericks (fl. 1600s), Dutch engineer and builder of Fort Amsterdam
Dave Fredericks (born 1968), Australian computer consultant
Hal Fredericks, Canadian author and economic consultant
John D. Fredericks (1869–1945), American politician and Republican Representative for California

See also
Alice O'Fredericks (1899–1968), Danish actress and film director
Frederick's of Hollywood, American lingerie retailer
Frederick (given name)
Friedrich (surname)